Nathalie Doucet a French-born US citizen, is the founder of Arts of Fashion Foundation, a non-profit organization, based in San Francisco, California.,  and of InvestFashion, an online platform created to finance entrepreneurial fashion designers by way of crowdsourcing/crowdfunding. It is geared towards finding and uniting investors with awarded fashion designers.

References

External links 
sfgate.com
sfindiefashion.com
sfgate.com afingo.com
afingo.com
nymag.com
theposhreport.com
sfgate.com
 Official Website
 InvestFashion Website

Living people
American fashion businesspeople
People from the San Francisco Bay Area
Year of birth missing (living people)
French emigrants to the United States